"Sing Along" is a pop song by Swedish singer and composer Per Gessle from his album Party Crasher.  It was released as the second single from the album on 4 February 2009 and features two different sleeves, one red and one green.

An acoustic version of the song was performed live at TV4's breakfast television programme "Nyhetsmorgon" on 6 December 2008. It featured both Per Gessle and Helena Josefsson (vocals), Clarence Öfwerman (piano), Magnus Börjesson (bass) and Jonas Isacsson (acoustic guitar).

Critical reception
When Expressen's Andreas Nunstedt reviewed the Party Crasher album he noted that Helena Josefsson, who sang like a British nightingale from the 1960s on Son Of A Plumber, is prominent. Power ballad à la Joyride».

Track listing
Swedish CD single
(4 February 2009)

 "Sing Along" (Radio Edit) – 3:25
 "Theme From Roberta Right" – 3:05
 "Sing Along" (Album Version) – 4:01

Credits
Vocals by Per Gessle & Helena Josefsson.
Played and produced by Clarence Öfwerman, Christoffer Lundquist & Per Gessle.
Recorded at Aerosol Grey Machine, Vallarum, between January and September 2008.
Engineer: Christoffer Lundquist.
Mixed by Ronny Lahti.
Words & music by Per Gessle (1 & 3).
Words by Per Gessle, music by Gabriel Gessle & Per Gessle (2).
Published by Jimmy Fun Music.
Design by Pär Wickholm.
Photo by Åsa Nordin-Gessle (credited as "Woody").

Charts

References

External links

2009 singles
Per Gessle songs
Songs written by Per Gessle
2008 songs
Capitol Records singles
Song recordings produced by Clarence Öfwerman